Joseph Dillon Gunkel (born December 30, 1991) is an American professional baseball pitcher for the Fukuoka SoftBank Hawks of the Nippon Professional Baseball (NPB). He previously played for the Boston Red Sox, Baltimore Orioles, Los Angeles Dodgers and Miami Marlins organizations.

Career

Boston Red Sox
The Boston Red Sox chose Gunkel in the 18th round in the 2013 Major League Baseball draft. He signed with the club on June 19, 2013. He was assigned to the GCL Red Sox to begin his professional career. On July 6, he was assigned to the Lowell Spinners. Gunkel began the 2014 season with the Greenville Drive, and would later be assigned to the Salem Red Sox. In May 2015, Gunkel moved from Salem and started play with the Portland Sea Dogs.

Baltimore Orioles
On June 3, 2015, Gunkel was traded to the Baltimore Orioles in exchange for Alejandro De Aza. He was assigned to the Double-A Bowie Baysox. Gunkel started the 2016 season with the Triple-A Norfolk Tides. After the season, on November 18, 2016, Gunkel had his contract selected to the major league roster. He was designated for assignment by the Orioles on April 7, 2017 following the acquisition of Miguel Castro.

Los Angeles Dodgers
On April 10, 2017, Gunkel was traded to the Los Angeles Dodgers in exchange for a player to be named later. He was assigned to the Oklahoma City Dodgers after being claimed. On April 25, Gunkel was designated for assignment after pitching to a 4.00 ERA and allowing 5 runs in 9.0 innings pitched after appearing in only three Triple-A games for the Dodgers organization.

Miami Marlins
On April 27, 2017, Gunkel was claimed off waivers by the Miami Marlins and was assigned to the Jacksonville Jumbo Shrimp two days later. On May 10, Gunkel was designated for assignment for the third time in 2017. He went unclaimed this time, and was sent outright to the Jumbo Shrimp on May 12. He would spend the rest of the season with the Jumbo Shrimp and the New Orleans Baby Cakes. Gunkel was assigned to the Baby Cakes to begin the 2018 season and spent the entirety of the season with them, pitching to a 3.03 ERA and allowed 23 runs on 63 hits in 22 appearances. He began the 2019 season with the Baby Cakes and spent the season with New Orleans and the Jupiter Hammerheads. On November 4, 2019, he elected free agency.

Hanshin Tigers
On December 15, 2019, Gunkel signed with the Hanshin Tigers of the Nippon Professional Baseball. He made his NPB debut on June 24 for the Tigers and pitched 4.0 innings, giving up 3 runs on 7 hits. He became a free agent following the 2022 season.

Fukuoka SoftBank Hawks
On December 21, 2022, Gunkel signed with the Fukuoka SoftBank Hawks of Nippon Professional Baseball.

References

External links

1991 births
Living people
American expatriate baseball players in Japan
Baseball players from Florida
Bowie Baysox players
Fukuoka SoftBank Hawks players
Greenville Drive players
Gulf Coast Marlins players
Gulf Coast Red Sox players
Hanshin Tigers players
Jacksonville Jumbo Shrimp players
Jupiter Hammerheads players
Lowell Spinners players
New Orleans Baby Cakes players
Norfolk Tides players
Nippon Professional Baseball pitchers
Oklahoma City Dodgers players
Portland Sea Dogs players
Salem Red Sox players
Sportspeople from Boynton Beach, Florida
West Chester Golden Rams baseball players